Zakaria Grich (born 9 June 1996) is a French professional footballer who plays as a forward for Championnat National 3 side FC Ouest Tourangeau.

Career
Grich made his Ligue 2 debut for Chamois Niortais on 29 July 2016 in a 0–0 draw with Lens at the Stade René Gaillard.

On 20 June 2017, it was announced that Grich had joined National side Dunkerque for the duration of the 2017–18 season. He returned to Chamois Niortais for the 2018–19 season, where he only made 9 appearances, before leaving at the end of the season.

Grich remained without contract until 30 December 2019, where he signed with Championnat National 2 club Les Herbiers.

Personal life
Born in France, Grich is of Moroccan descent.

Career statistics

Honours 
Versailles

 Championnat National 2: 2021–22

References

External links
 

1996 births
Living people
People from Grasse
French footballers
French sportspeople of Moroccan descent
Association football forwards
Chamois Niortais F.C. players
USL Dunkerque players
Les Herbiers VF players
US Granville players
FC Versailles 78 players
Ligue 2 players
Championnat National players
Championnat National 2 players
Championnat National 3 players
Sportspeople from Alpes-Maritimes
Footballers from Provence-Alpes-Côte d'Azur